Trafalgar Street is the second full-length album by Australian Christian rock band Revive.

Track listing
"Can't Change Yesterday" – 3:45
"Tears of the Oppressed" – 4:26
"Take Me With You" – 3:49
"It Could Be" – 3:54
"Who You Are" – 4:23
"All Worked Out" – 3:33
"These Days" – 4:25
"Revolution" – 4:05
"I Need You" – 3:37
"Losers" – 3:31

2006 albums
Revive (band) albums